The Little Falls Commercial Historic District is a historic district in downtown Little Falls, Minnesota, consisting of the approximately 6 acres of 1st Street SE between 1st Avenue SE and 1st Avenue NE. The district was added to the National Register of Historic Places on July 22, 1994, for its significance as the historic commercial center of Little Falls.

The district comprises 37 buildings on 4 blocks along the intersection of 1st Street SE and Broadway Avenue, an area referred to as "Bank Square". Like the name suggests, multiple banks are located in the district, as well as many types of stores and restaurants. A movie theater and American Legion is also in the district.

Of the buildings, 32 are deemed contributing, and were built between 1887 and 1936.

Selected buildings are:
Buckman Hotel (1901), 100-106 First Avenue S.E., rebuilt to an 1892 design after a fire; a three-story brick building
Little Falls Theatre (1933), a Moderne building designed by Minneapolis architect Perry Crosier.

References

National Register of Historic Places in Morrison County, Minnesota
Historic districts on the National Register of Historic Places in Minnesota